Vinka Jeričević (born 30 November 1936) is a Yugoslav former swimmer. She competed in the women's 200 metre breaststroke at the 1956 Summer Olympics, placing fourth.

References

1936 births
Living people
Yugoslav female swimmers
Croatian female swimmers
Olympic swimmers of Yugoslavia
Swimmers at the 1956 Summer Olympics
Place of birth missing (living people)